Cambria is a village in northwestern Williamson County, Illinois, United States. The population was 1,228 at the 2010 census.

History

Cambria was established in the early 1900s by brothers Tom and Evan John, owners of the Carterville and Big Muddy Coal Company, which had opened a mine in the area around 1904.  The community was originally known as Lauder, but was changed to Cambria, the old Latin name for Wales, from which the John brothers hailed.  A post office known as Reeves opened in 1905, but its name was changed to Cambria in 1911.

Geography
Cambria is located at  (37.783054, -89.118533).

Demographics

As of the census of 2000, there were 1,330 people, 564 households, and 367 families residing in the village. The racial makeup of the village was 95.04% White, 2.26% African American, 0.45% Native American, 0.08% Asian, 0.75% from other races, and 1.43% from two or more races. Hispanic or Latino of any race were 1.73% of the population.

There were 564 households, out of which 35.3% had children under the age of 18 living with them, 47.9% were married couples living together, 14.5% had a female householder with no husband present, and 34.8% were non-families. 28.4% of all households were made up of individuals, and 10.5% had someone living alone who was 65 years of age or older. The average household size was 2.36 and the average family size was 2.91.

In the village, the population was spread out, with 26.3% under the age of 18, 13.4% from 18 to 24, 32.0% from 25 to 44, 17.7% from 45 to 64, and 10.7% who were 65 years of age or older. The median age was 30 years. For every 100 females, there were 91.9 males. For every 100 females age 18 and over, there were 86.0 males.

The median income for a household in the village was $25,870, and the median income for a family was $34,688. Males had a median income of $27,262 versus $20,750 for females. The per capita income for the village was $12,913. About 18.7% of families and 23.2% of the population were below the poverty line, including 25.4% of those under age 18 and 25.0% of those age 65 or over.

73.7% of the total village population has their high school diploma or equivalent. This is below the national average of 80.4%. The percentage of the total population that holds a bachelor's degree or above is also below the national average of 24.4%. Only 12.9% of citizens hold college level degrees.

Government

Village board meetings are held every first and third Tuesday of the month at the Cambria Village Hall located in the old Cambria Grade School.

Education

Cambria is located in the Carterville School District Unit 5. The Cambria Grade School closed in 2001 when the Tri-C communities of Carterville, Cambria, and Crainville consolidated all Kindergarten through middle school grade levels.

Cambria is located near John A. Logan College located in Carterville and Southern Illinois University in Carbondale.

Religion
Cambria is home to three churches.

Notable person

 Luther Harvel, outfielder for the Cleveland Indians

References

Villages in Illinois
Villages in Williamson County, Illinois
Welsh-American culture in Illinois